The 2023 RAPTOR King of Tough was the 5th stock car race of the 2023 NASCAR Xfinity Series, and the 32nd iteration of the event. The race was held on Saturday, March 18, 2023, in Hampton, Georgia at Atlanta Motor Speedway, a  permanent tri-oval shaped superspeedway. The race took the scheduled 163 laps to complete. In a chaotic finish, Austin Hill, driving for Richard Childress Racing, would hold off the field on the final restart, and earn his fifth career NASCAR Xfinity Series win, and his third of the season. Hill dominated the race as well, leading 103 laps. To fill out the podium, Daniel Hemric, driving for Kaulig Racing, and Ryan Truex, driving for Joe Gibbs Racing, would finish 2nd and 3rd, respectively.

Background 
Atlanta Motor Speedway is a 1.54-mile race track in Hampton, Georgia, United States, 20 miles (32 km) south of Atlanta. It has annually hosted NASCAR Cup Series stock car races since its inauguration in 1960.

The venue was bought by Speedway Motorsports in 1990. In 1994, 46 condominiums were built over the northeastern side of the track. In 1997, to standardize the track with Speedway Motorsports' other two intermediate ovals, the entire track was almost completely rebuilt. The project made the track one of the fastest on the NASCAR circuit. In July 2021 NASCAR announced that the track would be reprofiled for the 2022 season to have 28 degrees of banking and would be narrowed from 55 to 40 feet which the track claims will turn racing at the track similar to restrictor plate superspeedways. Despite the reprofiling being criticized by drivers, construction began in August 2021 and wrapped up in December 2021. The track has seating capacity of 71,000 to 125,000 people depending on the tracks configuration.

Entry list 

 (R) denotes rookie driver.
 (i) denotes driver who is ineligible for series driver points.

Starting lineup 
Qualifying was scheduled to be held on Friday, March 17, at 4:30 PM EST, but was cancelled due to constant rain showers. The starting lineup would be determined by a performance-based metric system. As a result, Sammy Smith, driving for Joe Gibbs Racing, would earn the pole. Dawson Cram would fail to qualify.

Race results 
During the first stage, Josh Williams sustained heavy damage on lap 27. When debris from his repaired car caused another caution, NASCAR parked him under the Damaged Vehicle Policy. In response, Williams stopped his car on the start/finish line and walked back to pit road with the car behind.

Stage 1 Laps: 40

Stage 2 Laps: 40

Stage 3 Laps: 83

Standings after the race 

Drivers' Championship standings

Note: Only the first 12 positions are included for the driver standings.

References 

NASCAR races at Atlanta Motor Speedway
2023 RAPTOR King of Tough 250
2023 in sports in Georgia (U.S. state)